Elektronika, also spelt Electronika and Electronica ("Electronics"), is the brand name used for many different electronic products built by factories belonging to the Soviet Ministry of Electronic Industry, including calculators, electronic watches, portable games, and radios. Many Elektronika designs were the result of efforts by Soviet engineers, who were working for the Soviet military–industrial complex but were challenged with producing consumer goods that were in great shortage in the Soviet Union. The brand is still in use in Belarus.

Calculators 

Most notable is a line of calculators, which started production in 1968.  The Elektronika calculators were produced in a variety of sizes and function sets, ranging from large, bulky four-function calculators to smaller models designed for use in schools operating on a special, safer 42V standard (like the MK-SCH-2).  As time progressed, Elektronika calculators were produced that supported more advanced calculations, with some of the most recent models even offering full programmability and functionality similar to today's American-designed graphing calculators.

The Elektronika brand is now used by Novosibirsk RPN programmable calculators Elektronika MK-152 (:ru:Электроника МК-152) and Elektronika MK-161 (:ru:Электроника МК-161).

Computers 

The following Elektronika computers used a Soviet Intel-compatible CPU:
 MS 1502, MS 1504 – XT clone
 KR-series (01/02/03/04) – mass production of popular Russian 8-bit homebrew RK-86 (:ru:Радио 86РК)

The following Elektronika computers used a Soviet CPU, compatible with PDP-11:
 Elektronika 60
 UKNC
 DVK – clone of SM EVM, stripped for mass production to satisfy general scientific and R&D needs
 BK-0010 and BK-0011M – stripped and low-cost version of DVK, targeted at teenagers and home users

Electronic toys 

Most Elektronika-branded electronic toys were Nintendo Game & Watch clones. These used the KB1013VK1-2 microprocessor, a Soviet clone of the Sharp SM-5A used in Game & Watch consoles.

The vast majority of the Elektronika electronic toys had model names that start with IM (ИМ Игра Микропроцессорная, a Russian acronym for "microprocessor based game)".

Some model names for Elektronika branded clones start with IE (ИЭ Игра Электронная, a Russian acronym for "Electronic game)".

The Elektronika electronic toys that had model names beginning with MG were manufactured by Angstrem and were designed for export with English packaging and inserts.

The known models include:
 24-01 Mickey Mouse (1984) – Nintendo MC-25 Mickey Mouse	
 IM-01 Chess computer (1986) – Designed and manufactured by Svetlana
 IM-01T Chess computer (1992) – Improved version of the IM-01, designed and manufactured by Svetlana
 IM-02 Well, Just You Wait! (1984) – Nintendo EG-26 Egg, a variation of Mickey Mouse without the Disney license.
 IM-03 Mysteries of the Ocean (1989) – Nintendo OC-22 Octopus
 IM-04 Merry Cook (1989) – Nintendo FP-24 Chef
 IM-05 Chess computer (1989) – Improved version of the IM-01, designed and manufactured by Svetlana
 MG-09 Space Bridge (1989) – Nintendo FR-27 Fire
 IM-10 Ice Hockey (1988) – Ice hockey-themed clone of Nintendo EG-26 Egg'
 IM-11 Lunokhod (1983) – Milton Bradley Bigtrak programmable battery-powered toy tank
 IM-12 Winnie the Pooh (1991) – Nintendo CJ-93 Donkey Kong Jr. panorama
 MG-13 Explorers of Space, also known as Space Scouts (1989)
 IM-15 Electronic Football – Tomy World Cup Soccer
 IM-18 Fowling (1989)
 IM-19 Biathlon
 IM-22 Monkey Goalkeeper, also known as Merry Footballer (1989)
 IM-23 Autoslalom (1989)
 MG-50 Amusing Arithmetics (1989)
 IM-23 Car Slalom (1991)
 IM-26 Interchangeable. Display cartridges included IM-02 Well, Just You Wait!, IM-22 Merry Footballer, IM-23 Autoslalom, IM-10 Ice Hockey, and IM-32 Cat Fisherman (1991) – Bandai Digi Casse
 IM-29 Chess Partner (1991) – Mattel Electronics Computer Chess
 IM-30 Orpheus synthesizer (1991) – Designed and manufactured by Svetlana
 IM-32 Cat Fisherman (1991)
 IM-50 Space Flight (1992)

Post-1992 versions:
 I-01 Car Slalom
 I-02 Merry Cook
 I-03 Space Bridge
 I-04 Fisher Tom-Cat
 I-05 Naval Combat
 I-06 Just You wait!
 I-07 Frog boaster
 I-08 Fowling
 I-09 Explorers of Space
 I-10 Biathlon
 I-11 Circus
 I-12 Hockey
 I-13 Merry Footballer
 I-14 Night Thiefes
 I-15 Mysteries of the Ocean
 I-20 (option 1) Air Shooting Range (1994) – Nintendo BU-201 Spitball Sparky I-20 (option 2) Supercubes (1994) – Tetris''

Tape recorders (audio)

Reel-to-reel 
 100S (1970, portable stereo)
 ТА1-003 Stereo (1980)
 004 Stereo
 MPK 007 S (1987)

Cassette 
 203-S (1980, portable stereo)
 204-S (1984, stereo deck)
 MH-205 stereo (1985, car stereo player)
 206-stereo
 211-S (1983, portable stereo)
 301 (1972, portable)
 302, 302-1, 302-2 (1974 till 1990s, portable)
 305 (1984, portable)
 306 (1986, portable stereo)
 311-S (1977, portable stereo)
 321/322 (1978, portable)
 323/324 (1981, portable)
 M-327 (1987, portable)
 M-334S (1990, portable stereo component system with detachable recorder M-332S)
 М-402S (1990, pocket stereo)
 Elektronika-mini (199?, pocket stereo)

External links 

 Museum of Soviet Calculators On the Web (MOSCOW)
 Collection of Elektronika watches
 Article on Elektronika watches
 Soviet Digital Electronics Museum

References

Science and technology in the Soviet Union
Computing in the Soviet Union
Soviet brands
Electronics companies of the Soviet Union
Ministry of the Electronics Industry (Soviet Union)